Valery Skrug (June 20, 1963, Vikno, Chernivtsi Oblast, Zastavna Raion) is a Russian political figure, deputy of the 5th, 7th and 8th State Dumas. 

In 1994, Skrug was appointed president of the Belgorod Region Chamber of Commerce and Industry. In 2001 and 2005, he was elected deputy of the Belgorod City Duma of the 3rd and 4th convocations. In 2011, he received a deputy mandate for the 5th State Duma. Skrug was re-elected in 2016 and 2021 for the 7th and 8th State Dumas, respectively.

Awards 
 Order of Friendship
 Order "For Merit to the Fatherland"

References

1963 births
Living people
United Russia politicians
21st-century Russian politicians
Eighth convocation members of the State Duma (Russian Federation)
Seventh convocation members of the State Duma (Russian Federation)
Fifth convocation members of the State Duma (Russian Federation)